ER lumen protein retaining receptor 2 is a protein that in humans is encoded by the KDELR2 gene.

Retention of resident soluble proteins in the lumen of the endoplasmic reticulum (ER) is achieved in both yeast and animal cells by their continual retrieval from the cis-Golgi, or a pre-Golgi compartment.  Sorting of these proteins is dependent on a C-terminal tetrapeptide signal, lys-asp-glu-leu (KDEL) in animal cells and his-asp-glu-leu (HDEL) in S. cerevisiae.  This process is mediated by a receptor that recognizes, and binds the tetrapeptide-containing protein, and returns it to the ER.  In yeast, the sorting receptor encoded by a single gene, ERD2, is a seven-transmembrane protein.  Unlike yeast, several human homologs of the ERD2 gene, constituting the KDEL receptor gene family, have been described. KDELR2 was the second member of the family to be identified, and it encodes a protein which is 83% identical to the KDELR1 gene product.

See also
KDELR1
KDELR3

References

Further reading

Endoplasmic reticulum resident proteins